is a town located in Iwate Prefecture, Japan. , the town had an estimated population of 8,987, and a population density of 9.1 persons per km² in 4366 households.

History
The area of present-day Iwaizumi was part of the ancient Mutsu Province, which was dominated by the Nambu clan during the Edo period, who ruled Morioka Domain under the Tokugawa shogunate.

With the Meiji period establishment of the modern municipalities system, the village of Iwaizumi was created within Kitahei District on April 1, 1889. Kitahei, Nakahei and Higashihei Districts were all merged into Minamihei District on March 29, 1896.

Iwaizumi was elevated to town status on August 1, 1922. On September 30, 1956, Imaizumi annexed the neighboring villages of Akka, Ugei, Okawa and Omoto and on April 1, 1957, annexed the village of Kogawa to reach is present borders.

In August 2016, Typhoon Lionrock hit the town with strong winds and heavy rain that caused landslides and flooding. 19 people died, including 9 people who drowned in a nursing home after a river burst its banks.

Geography
Iwaizumi is in the Kitakami Mountains of northeast Iwate prefecture, east of the prefectural capital of Morioka. It has a small coastline on the Pacific Ocean to the east.  The area has numerous limestone caves, including the Ryūsendō.

Neighboring municipalities
Iwate Prefecture
Morioka
Kuji
Miyako
Fudai
Tanohata
Kuzumaki
Noda

Climate
Iwaizumi has a humid climate (Köppen climate classification Cfa) characterized by mild summers and cold winters with heavy snowfall.  The average annual temperature in Iwaizumi is 9.5 °C. The average annual rainfall is 1283 mm with September as the wettest month and February as the driest month. The temperatures are highest on average in August, at around 22.3 °C, and lowest in January, at around −2.0 °C.

Demographics
Per Japanese census data, the population of Iwaizumi peaked in around the year 1960 and has declined steadily over the past 60 years, and is now less than half of what it was in the year 1970, and less than it was a century ago.

Government
Iwaizumi has a mayor-council form of government with a directly elected mayor and a unicameral village council of 10 members. Iwaizumi, together with the city of Miyako and the villages of Fudai, Tanohata and Yamada, collectively contributes three seats to the Iwate Prefectural legislature. In terms of national politics, the village is part of Iwate 2nd district of the lower house of the Diet of Japan.

Economy
The local economy is based on agriculture and to a lesser extent on commercial fishing.

Education
Iwaizumi has ten public elementary schools and five public junior high schools operated by the town government, and one public high school operated by the Iwate Prefectural Board of Education.

Transportation

Railway
Sanriku Railway – Kita-Rias Line
 

The JR East Iwaizumi Line, which connected Iwaizumi with Moichi Station on the Yamada Line suspended operations on 31 July 2010, due to a landslide. The line was officially closed on April 1, 2014, owing to low public demand.

Highway

Local attractions
Ryūsendō – cave system
Akkadō – cave system

International relations
 – Wisconsin Dells, Wisconsin, USA, sister city since August 1990

Noted people from Iwaizumi
Rika Miura – actress
Kin Endate – amateur astronomer

References

External links

Official Website 

 
Towns in Iwate Prefecture
Populated coastal places in Japan